This is a list of fellows of the Royal Society elected in its 18th year, 1677.

Fellows 
George Ent  (1644–1679)
Sir George Croke  (d. 1680)
Christopher Adolphus Baldwin  (1632–1682)
Sir Peter Colleton  (1635–1694)
Robert Plot  (1640–1696)
Thomas Gale  (1636–1702)
Thomas Smith  (1638–1710)
John Flamsteed  (1646–1719)
Sir George Wheler  (1650–1723)
Oliver Hill  (b. 1630)
John Herbert  (b. 1647)
Edmund Wyndham  (b. 1659)

References

1677
1677 in science
1677 in England